The Bolivian blackbird (Oreopsar bolivianus) is a species of bird in the family Icteridae. It is monotypic within the genus Oreopsar.

It is endemic to Bolivia, where its natural habitats are subtropical or tropical high-altitude shrubland and pastureland.

References

Bolivian blackbird
Bolivian blackbird
Birds of the Bolivian Andes
Endemic birds of Bolivia
Bolivian blackbird
Bolivian blackbird
Taxonomy articles created by Polbot